The Hohhot–Beihai Expressway, designated as G59 and commonly referred to as the Hubei Expressway (not to be confused with the province of Hubei), is an incomplete expressway in China. It is a major north–south expressway that when complete, will connect the cities of Hohhot, the capital of Inner Mongolia, with Beihai, on the southern coast, in the autonomous region of Guangxi. The expressway was announced as one of the eleven primary north–south expressways in China's expressway network on 24 May 2013.

References 

Chinese national-level expressways
Expressways in Inner Mongolia
Expressways in Shanxi
Expressways in Henan
Expressways in Hunan
Expressways in Hubei
Expressways in Guangxi